Events from the year 2005 in Taiwan, Republic of China. This year is numbered Minguo 94 according to the official Republic of China calendar.

Incumbents
 President – Chen Shui-bian
 Vice President – Annette Lu
 Premier – Yu Shyi-kun, Frank Hsieh
 Vice Premier – Yeh Chu-lan, Wu Rong-i

Events

January
 1 January – The founding of Taipei Fubon Bank with the merger of Fubon Bank and TaipeiBank.
 22 January – The official opening of Bangka Park in Wanhua District, Taipei.
 27 January – The opening of Jingtong Mining Industry Museum in Pingxi District, New Taipei.

March
 14 March – Mainland China passed the Anti-Secession Law, a bill to prevent Taiwan from being an independent nation.

April
 1 April – The renaming of National Space Program Office to National Space Organization.
 29 April – The opening of Baguashan Tunnel.

May

 14 May – 2005 Republic of China National Assembly election. Annette Lu of the Democratic Progressive Party won the election.
 17 May – The relocation of Pingtung Airport to the southern field upon the completion of the new airport building.

July
 1 July – The establishment of Taiwan Indigenous Television, Asia's first aboriginal television channel.
 16 July – 2005 Kuomintang chairmanship election took place. Ma Ying-jeou won the election, casting a total votes cast of 370,054 and a percentage of vote of 72.4%.
 18 July – Typhoon Haiting hit Taiwan. The typhoon has winds up to 114 mph.
 22 July – The establishment of TTV World.

August
 2 August – President Chen Shui-bian proposed Four-Stage Theory of the Republic of China.
 31 August
 Typhoon Talim hit Taiwan. It caused about $1.5 billion in damage.
 The establishment of Taipower Exhibit Center in Southern Taiwan in Hengchun, Pingtung County.

September
 3–6 September – The 10th Computer Olympiad took place in Taipei. It was a competition where computer programs competed each other in a variety of games.

October
 1 October – The opening of Wulai Atayal Museum in Wulai Township, Taipei County.
 27 October – The opening of Linkou Line of Taiwan Railways Administration.

November
 26 November – The establishment of Siraya National Scenic Area.
 28 November – The opening of Baoshan Station of Taiwan Railways Administration in Taoyuan City, Taoyuan County.

December
 3 December – 2005 Republic of China local election.

Deaths
 3 January – Koo Chen-fu, 87, Chairman of Straits Exchange Foundation (1990-2005).
 6 April – Hsu Hai-ching, 92, Taiwanese gangster
 15 June – Henry Kao, 91, Minister of Transportation and Communications (1972-1976).
 1 November – Ma Ho-ling, 84, father of President Ma Ying-jeou.

See also

 Timeline of the 2005 Pacific typhoon season

References

External links
Year 2005 Calendar - Taiwan
Taiwan, 2005 Timeline

 
Years of the 21st century in Taiwan